The Lake Laurentian Conservation Area is a  conservation area in Greater Sudbury, Ontario. Extending from the southeastern shore of Lake Ramsey to the Southeast Bypass, the park incorporates a large green space, several lakes (including the eponymous Lake Laurentian), a self-guided nature trail, wetland areas, hiking trails, bird watching areas, and snowshoeing and cross-country ski trails in winter.

First established in the early 1960s by the Junction Creek Conservation Authority, the conservation area also cooperates with the city's school boards as a partner in natural and environmental science education programs.

External links

 Lake Laurentian Conservation Area

Parks in Greater Sudbury
Conservation areas in Ontario